The Western Himalayas refers to the western half of the Himalayas, in northern Pakistan and northwestern India. It is also known as the Punjab Himalayas. Four of the five tributaries of the Indus River in Punjab (Beas, Chenab, Jhelum, and Ravi) rise in the Western Himalayas; while the fifth, the Sutlej cuts through the range after rising in Tibet.

Included within the Western Himalayas are the Zanskar Range, the Pir Panjal Range, and the Dhauladhar Range, and western parts of the Sivalik Range and the Great Himalayas. The highest point is Nanga Parbat (26,660 feet or 8,126 metres), at the northwestern end of the region.

Rivers

The Jhelum river rises in the Pir Panjal Range in Indian-administered Jammu and Kashmir, and flows northwestward through the Vale of Kashmir before entering Pakistani-administered Azad Jammu and Kashmir and eventually entering the plains near Mirpur. The Chenab river originates in Himachal Pradesh near Chandra Taal and forms the Lahaul Valley in the state and the Chenab Valley in neighbouring Jammu before entering the plains near Akhnoor. The Ravi river which flows through the Chamba Valley and the Beas river which flows through the Kullu and the Kangra valleys both originate in Himachal Pradesh state as well. The Sutlej river rises in Tibet, enters Himachal Pradesh near Shipki La pass, flows through Kinnaur where it is joined by its tributaries Spiti and Baspa, before entering the plains near Ropar in Punjab.

Ecology

Flora
 Northwestern Himalayan alpine shrub and meadows
 Western Himalayan alpine shrub and meadows
 Western Himalayan broadleaf forests
 Western Himalayan subalpine conifer forests

Economic activities

Agriculture is the main economic activity in the area. The main crops grown in this region are paddy and wheat. The region is a major hub of horticulture in the Indian subcontinent. Apples are grown in the Kashmir, Kinnaur, Kishtwar, and Kullu valleys, as well as the Hills of Shimla. These regions, particularly Kashmir and the Shimla Hills produce almost all the apples grown in India and South Asia. Saffron is also grown in Kashmir and Kishtwar, while dry fruits are grown in several areas of the western Himalayan region. Tea is grown in the Kangra valley. A large number of people from nomadic pastoral communities such as Gurjars, Bakarwals and Gaddis living in the alpine and subalpine areas of these mountains engage in cattle rearing.

Tourism is another major industry. The city of Srinagar in the Kashmir Valley is famous for its houseboats and shikaras on the Dal and Nigeen lakes. Murree, Pahalgam, Sonmarg, Gulmarg, Dalhousie, Mcleodganj, Dharamshala, Manali and Shimla are famous hill stations. Amarnath and Vaishno Devi are important pilgrimage centres attracting several hundred thousands of pilgrims each year. Gulmarg and Manali are popular winter-sports destinations where activities such as skiing, snowboarding, sledding etc. are done, while adventure sports like paragliding are done at Bir and Billing.

Several perennial rivers flow through these mountains which makes them ideal for hydroelectricity generation, and thus several hydroelectric projects are complete or underway in Pakistan and India.

Cultural significance

Many sites revered by people belonging to various faith and religions.

Pilgrimage sites
 Amarnath Cave Temple
 Gurudwara Shri Hemkund Sahib
 Jwala Ji
 Vaishno Devi, Katra

See also 
 Aksai Chin
 Eastern Himalayas
 Himalayas
 Kashmir
 Punjab

References

.
.
Mountain ranges of Afghanistan
Mountain ranges of India
Mountain ranges of Nepal
Mountain ranges of Pakistan
Mountain ranges of Tibet
Mountain ranges of Tajikistan
Regions of China
Regions of India
Regions of Pakistan
Regions of Nepal
Physiographic divisions